Khairul Enam is a politician, lawyer and former Member of Parliament for Laxmipur-3 constituency in Laxmipur district of Bangladesh

Early life 
Enam was born in Laxmipur district.

Career 
Enam was elected as a Member of Parliament from Laxmipur-3 constituency as a candidate of Bangladesh Nationalist Party in the 5th Parliamentary Election of 1991. He was also elected as a Member of Parliament from Laxmipur-3 constituency as a candidate of Bangladesh Nationalist Party in the 7th Parliamentary Election of 12 June 1996.

তথ্যসূত্র 

7th Jatiya Sangsad members
5th Jatiya Sangsad members
Bangladesh Nationalist Party politicians
Year of birth missing (living people)
Living people
People from Lakshmipur District